The Stone Roses are an English rock band.

The Stone Roses may also refer to:

The Stone Roses (album), the debut album of the band
The Stone Roses: Made of Stone, a documentary about the band
 The Stone Roses (novel), a 1959 novel by Sarah Gainham

See also
The Stone Rose, a Doctor Who novel